Boquim is a municipality located in the Brazilian state of Sergipe. Its population was 26,899 (2020) and its area is 215 km².

References

Municipalities in Sergipe